Qaleh (also Romanized as Qal‘eh; also known as Qal‘eh Gūkān and Qal‘eh-ye Gūkān) is a village in Rahgan Rural District, Khafr District, Jahrom County, Fars Province, Iran. At the 2006 census, its population was 364, in 100 families.

References 

Populated places in  Jahrom County